Ameerega braccata, formerly Epipedobates braccatus, is a species of frog in the family Dendrobatidae. It is endemic to the Central-West Region of Brazil and is known from southern Mato Grosso, Mato Grosso do Sul, and southwestern Goiás states; however, it is likely that its true range extends into adjacent Bolivia and Paraguay.

Description
Skin is slightly granular. The fingers bear small discs. The dorsum is dark brown with pale brown marbling and, in most individuals, yellowish spots. The flanks are black. There are two yellowish white to yellow dorsolateral stripes extending from the tip of the snout to the groin. The belly is brownish white with
scattered small black spots. The chest and throat are brown.

Ameerega braccata produces several types of calls. The male advertisement call consists of a single, unpulsed note lasting about 0.1 seconds, with a frequency range from 3.5–4.2 kHz. The territorial call is composed of 5–6 repeated notes that are structurally similar to the advertisement call notes. The courtship call is emitted in close-range male–female interactions. These calls consist of short notes (duration 0.04 seconds) and may reach frequencies of 2.2–5.3 kHz.

Diet
Ameerega braccata has a specialized diet in ants, termites, and mites. Additionally, the abundance of consumed prey differed among the males and females of this species.

Habitat and conservation
This frog inhabits gallery forests in the Cerrado and cound be found amidst leaf litter; they have also been recorded in more open areas. The eggs are deposited on land; the larvae are then transported (in at least one occasion, by the male) to streams where they develop further.

Ameerega braccata does not adapt well to anthropogenic disturbance and is therefore threatened by habitat loss caused by agriculture (both crops and livestock) and by fires. It is present in the Pantanal Matogrossense and Chapada dos Guimarães National Parks.

References

braccata
Endemic fauna of Brazil
Amphibians of Brazil
Amphibians described in 1864
Taxa named by Franz Steindachner
Taxonomy articles created by Polbot